Japan participated in the 2009 Asian Martial Arts Games in Bangkok, Thailand on August 1 – August 9 2009. The nation finished fifth in the medal table after collected 9 gold, 2 silver, and 3 bronze medals.

Medal table

Medalists

Competitors

| width=78% align=left valign=top |
The following is the list of number of competitors participating in the Games.

Judo

Men

Women

Karate

Men

Women

Muaythai

Taekwondo

Men

Women

References

Japan at the Asian Indoor Games
2009 in Japanese sport